Thomas Somerset (born by 1529, died 6 April 1586) was an English Roman Catholic layman, kept imprisoned for long periods by Elizabeth I of England.

Life
He was the second son of Henry Somerset, 2nd Earl of Worcester.

He became a servant of Bishop Stephen Gardiner, and was MP for Monmouthshire in 1553 and 1554.

He was committed to the Fleet prison, 10 June 1562, "for translating an oratyon out of Frenche, made by the Cardinall of Lorraine", i.e. Charles, Cardinal of Lorraine, Archbishop of Reims, "and putting the same without authority in prynte". On 27 June 1562, he was summoned before the Lords of the Council at Greenwich, who expected "an humble submission, for wante whereof, and for that he seamed to go about to justifye his cause, he was returned to the Flete, there to remaine until he" should "have better considered of himself".

After an imprisonment of close on twenty years he was released on bail, 28 February 1581-82, to attend to legal business in Monmouthshire. On 2 May 1582, he was too ill to travel, and was permitted to remain at liberty till he should recover. By 22 October 1585, suspected of complicity with Mary Queen of Scots, he was in the Tower on a charge of high treason. Being possessed of properties in Gloucestershire and Monmouthshire, he paid the costs of his imprisonment, and his name therefore is not to be found in the Tower Bills. He died 6 April 1586 in the Tower, and his will was proved on 27 May of the same year.

Ancestry

References

Attribution

The entry cites:
Catholic Record Society Publications, I (London, 1905, etc.), 49; 
Dasent, Acts of the Privy Council (London, 1890–1907), VII, 108; XIII, 336, 407; 
Calendar of State Papers Domestic 1581-90 (London, 1865), 249, 278, 305; 
Collins, Peerage, I (London, 1779), 201.

1530 births
1587 deaths
English Roman Catholics
16th-century Roman Catholics
16th-century English people
Prisoners in the Tower of London
Younger sons of earls